Dignamoconcha is a monotypic genus of pinhead or dot snails that is endemic to Australia's Lord Howe Island in the Tasman Sea.

Species
 Dignamoconcha dulcissima Iredale, 1944 – the pagoda pinhead snail

Description
The trochoidal shell of the mature snail is 3.3 mm in height, with a diameter of 5.7 mm, with a stepped, pagoda-like spire. It is pale golden-brown in colour, with white radial streaks. The whorl profile is flattened above and below a strongly keeled periphery. It has a diamond-shaped aperture and widely open umbilicus. It is the largest known punctid in Australia.

Distribution and habitat
Although the snail is sometimes reported from other sites on the island, its main area of occurrence is on the slopes of the southern mountains, at altitudes of 200–600 m in rainforest, where it is arboreal and found on the undersides of green leaves, especially those of palms.

References

 
 

 
Punctidae
Monotypic gastropod genera
Taxa named by Tom Iredale
Gastropods described in 1944
Gastropods of Lord Howe Island